Anastasia Anastasio (born 15 July 1990) is an Italian compound archer.

Biography
She is the current World Archery number thirteen in women's compound archery. The highest ranking she has reached is the sixth position, which she reached for the last time in May 2010.

Achievements
Source:

2005
 Junior Outdoor European Championships, women's team, Silkeborg
 Junior Field European Championships, women's team, Rogla
 Junior Field European Championships, individual, Rogla
2006
 3rd Cadet World Championships, individual, Mérida
 Junior Field World Championships, individual, Gothenburg
2007
 Junior Indoor World Championships, individual, Izmir
 World Outdoor Championships, women's team, Leipzig
33rd, World Outdoor Championships, individual, Leipzig
2008
4th, Youth World Championships, women's team, Antalya
13th, Youth World Championships, individual, Antalya
2009
 World Cup, individual, Shanghai
9th, World Outdoor Championships, women's team, Ulsan
17th, World Outdoor Championships, individual, Ulsan

2010
 European Outdoor Championships, women's team, Rovereto
9th, European Outdoor Championships, mixed team, Rovereto
17th, European Outdoor Championships, individual, Rovereto
2011
 Summer Universiade, mixed team, Shenzhen
5th, Summer Universiade, women's team, Shenzhen
17th, Summer Universiade, individual, Shenzhen
2012
 World Cup, women's team, Shanghai
 World Cup, women's team, Antalya
 European Outdoor Championships, individual, Amsterdam
 European Outdoor Championships, women's team, Amsterdam

References

External links
 

Italian female archers
Living people
1990 births
Universiade medalists in archery
Universiade bronze medalists for Italy
Archers of Marina Militare
Medalists at the 2011 Summer Universiade
21st-century Italian women